George Ormsby (19 February 1913 – 1 September 1965) was an Irish Gaelic footballer. His championship career at senior level with the Mayo county team lasted ten seasons from 1932 until 1941.

Ormsby made his senior debut for Mayo during the 1932 championship and quickly became a regular member of the starting fifteen. Over the course of the following decade he enjoyed much success, the highlight being in 1936 when he won an All-Ireland medal. Ormsby also won five Connacht medals and seven National Football League medals.

Honours
Mayo
All-Ireland Senior Football Championship (1): 1936
Connacht Senior Football Championship (5): 1932, 1935, 1936, 1937, 1939
National Football League (7): 1933-34, 1934-35, 1935-36, 1936-37, 1937-38, 1938-39, 1940-41

Connacht
Railway Cup (2): 1934, 1936

References

1913 births
1965 deaths
Ballina Stephenites Gaelic footballers
Connacht inter-provincial Gaelic footballers
Gaelic football backs
Garda Síochána officers
Mayo inter-county Gaelic footballers
People from Ballina, County Mayo